Ross Oakes (born 12 October 1996) is an English professional rugby league footballer who plays as a  for the Sheffield Eagles in Betfred Championship.

Background
Oakes was born in Bradford, West Yorkshire, England.

He is a product of the Bradford Bulls Academy system and signed his first professional contract in October 2015. Oakes previously played for local amateur side Drighlington ARLFC.

Bradford Bulls
2016 - 2016 Season

Oakes did not feature in any of the pre season friendlies.

He featured in Round 10 (Dewsbury Rams) then in Round 17 (Workington Town). Oakes then played in the Championship Shield in Game 6 (Workington Town) to the Final (Sheffield Eagles). He scored against Workington Town (1 try) and Sheffield Eagles (3 tries).

2017 - 2017 Season

Oakes featured in the pre-season friendlies against Huddersfield and the Keighley Cougars. He scored against Huddersfield (1 try) and Keighley (1 try).

Oakes featured in Round 1 (Hull Kingston Rovers) to Round 13 (Sheffield Eagles) then in Round 17 (Featherstone Rovers) to Round 19 (Oldham). He also featured in the Championship Shield Game 7 (Rochdale). Oakes also played in the 2017 Challenge Cup in Round 4 (Featherstone Rovers). He scored against the Hull Kingston Rovers (1 try), the Swinton Lions (1 try), Toulouse Olympique (1 try), Batley (2 tries), Dewsbury (1 try), the Sheffield Eagles (1 try), the Featherstone Rovers (2 tries) and Rochdale (1 try).

At the end of the season Oakes signed a two-year contract extension with the Bradford club.

2018 - 2018 Season

Oakes featured in the pre-season friendlies against Halifax R.L.F.C., Sheffield Eagles and Dewsbury.

Oakes played in Round 6 (Workington Town) then in Round 15 (Coventry Bears) to Round 22 (Workington Town). He also played in Round 26 (Hemel Stags) then in the Final (Workington Town). Oakes played in the 2018 Challenge Cup in Round 4 (Hunslet R.L.F.C.) to Round 5 (Warrington). He scored against Hemel Stags (1 try).

2019 - 2019 Season

Oakes featured in the pre-season friendly against York City Knights. He scored against York City (1 try).

Oakes featured in Round 1 (Featherstone Rovers) to Round 3 (Sheffield Eagles) then in Round 5 (Toulouse Olympique) to Round 8 (Leigh). Oakes then played in Round 10 (Halifax R.L.F.C.) and Round 12 (Rochdale) to Round 27 (Rochdale). Oakes also played in the 2019 Challenge Cup in Round 4 (Keighley Cougars) to Quarter Final (Halifax R.L.F.C.). He scored against the Sheffield Eagles (1 try), Batley (1 try), the Rochdale Hornets (2 tries), Widnes (1 try), Toulouse Olympique (1 try), the York City Knights (1 try), the Barrow (1 try) and the Dewsbury (1 try). Following the financial problems in the off season, Oakes signed a new two-year deal at the Bradford club.

2020 - 2020 Season

Oakes featured in the pre-season friendlies against Castleford, Leeds, Dewsbury and the York City Knights. He scored against Leeds (1 try).

Oakes played in Round 1 (London Broncos) to Round 5 (Sheffield Eagles). Oakes also featured in the 2020 Challenge Cup in Round 4 (Underbank Rangers) to Round 5 (Wakefield Trinity).

2021 - 2021 Season

Oakes featured in the pre-season friendly against Swinton. He scored against Swinton (1 try).

Oakes played in Round 1 (Sheffield Eagles) to Round 9 (Featherstone Rovers) then in Round 11 (Widnes) to Elimination Playoff (Batley). Oakes also featured in the 2021 Challenge Cup in Round 1 (Featherstone Rovers). He scored against Dewsbury (1 try), York City (1 try) and Swinton (1 try).

Sheffield Eagles
In November 2021, Oakes joined Sheffield Eagles on a two-year deal.

Statistics
Statistics do not include pre-season friendlies.

References

External links
Bradford Bulls profile
Bulls profile

1996 births
Living people
Bradford Bulls players
English rugby league players
Rugby league centres
Rugby league players from Bradford
Sheffield Eagles players